David Boyle, Lord Boyle FRSE (26 July 1772 – 4 February 1853) was a British judge.

Life
Boyle was born at Shewalton near Irvine on 26 July 1772, the son of Elizabeth Dunlop, daughter of Professor Alexander Dunlop, and the Honorable Reverend Patrick Boyle of Shewalton (died 1798), son of John Boyle, 2nd Earl of Glasgow. His father had inherited the Shewalton estate through his law lord uncle, Patrick Boyle, Lord Shewalton, who had never married.

He studied law at the University of St Andrews (1787) and then at the University of Glasgow (1789).

He became an advocate in 1793 and rose to be Solicitor General. He was based at 41 George Street in Edinburgh.

In 1798 he inherited the Shewalton estate on his father's death.

He was Member of Parliament (MP) for Ayrshire from 1807 to 1811 and served as Solicitor General for Scotland during that period. In 1811 he was appointed a Senator of the College of Justice, with the judicial title Lord Boyle. He was Lord Justice Clerk from 1811 to 1841. He became a Privy Counsellor in 1820 and Lord Justice General from 1841 to 1852.

From 1815 to 1817 he served as Rector of the University of Glasgow.

In 1833 his address was listed as 28 Charlotte Square at the west end of Edinburgh's New Town. He is buried near his family in Dundonald Churchyard in Ayrshire.

Family
Boyle married firstly, in 1804, Elizabeth Montgomery (died April 1822), daughter of Alexander Montgomery, and niece of Hugh Montgomerie the Earl of Eglinton. They had several children, including Patrick Boyle, father of David Boyle, 7th Earl of Glasgow; and Alexander Boyle, a vice-admiral in the Royal Navy.

Boyle married secondly, in 1827, Catherine Campbell Smythe, daughter of David Smythe, Lord Methven. Their children included George David Boyle, who became Dean of Salisbury. Boyle died on 4 February 1853, aged 80. His second wife died in December 1880.

His daughter, Helen, married Charles Dalrymple Fergusson, Baronet of Kilkerran.

Memberships
Highland Society (1804)
Fellow of the Royal Society of Edinburgh (1820)

Notes

References

External links 
 
thepeerage.com "Rt. Hon. David Boyle", The Peerage

1772 births
1853 deaths
Members of the Parliament of the United Kingdom for Scottish constituencies
UK MPs 1807–1812
Boyle
Lords Justice-General
Members of the Privy Council of the United Kingdom
David
Alumni of the University of St Andrews
Alumni of the University of Glasgow
Solicitors General for Scotland
Fellows of the Royal Society of Edinburgh
Boyle